Viza or VI·ZA (formerly known as Visa) was an American rock band from Los Angeles, California, using oud, duduk and percussion fused with more conventional rock elements such as guitar, bass and drums.  The band has released various EPs and full-length albums. The band's music mixes Armenian and Greek-inflected styles with elements of modern aggressive rock and traditional music. The band sometimes blends these various flavors with dance and satirical social commentary. 

Viza has performed at Hungary's Sziget Festival, Sweden's Malmöfestivalen, Norway's Kartfestivalen, and Slovenia's Schengenfest and Trnfest festivals, among dozens of headline shows, as a part of 6 European tours over the past several years.

Viza was associated with Serjical Strike Management headed by Serj Tankian from System of a Down from 2009-2012, also featuring Tankian as a guest vocalist on their track "Viktor". In August 2010, Viza embarked on a series of introductory performances in Europe, opening for Serj Tankian's “Imperfect Harmonies” Tour in the cities of Yerevan, Athens, Hamburg, Cologne, Paris, Zurich, and Bologna. Viza accompanied Serj Tankian again during his "Harakiri" World Tour in the Fall of 2012 as the main support act for 19 shows throughout North America and Europe.

In December 2011, the band released their fourth full-length album, Carnivalia, and released the title track as a single. In July 2012, the band recorded and released their third single, a cover of the 1927 "Alabama Song (whisky bar)" by Bertolt Brecht and Kurt Weill. In 2014, Viza released their album Aria, and toured as direct support for Gogol Bordello, Skindred, and Soil.

After a brief hiatus to focus on individual music projects, beginning in late 2017, Viza released a series of new recordings via YouTube on the first day of every month continuing into 2018. These 12 tracks were divided into two EPs named "The Unorthodox Revival", in two separate Volumes. The band continues its activities locally in Los Angeles and performed in Paris in May 2019 in support of the My Ouai charitable foundation for providing musical opportunities to disabled children in France.

Discography

Studio albums 
2006 - Maktub (as Visa)
2008 - Eros (as Visa)
2010 - Made In Chernobyl
2011 - Carnivalia
2014 - Aria

EPs 
2001 - Visa (as Visa)
2007 - De Facto (as Visa)
2018 - The Unorthodox Revival I
2018 - The Unorthodox Revival II

Singles 
2011 - Bake Me In Clouds
2012 - Alabama Song (Whisky Bar) (Bertolt Brecht, Kurt Weill)
2013 - In Coins
2014 - Midnight Hour
2014 - Fuego
2014 - When Doves Cry (Prince)
2014 - Naive Melody (Talking Heads)
2019 - Eros
2020 - Loyal Tea
2022 - Yesterday
2023 - Ms. Information

Band members
K'noup Tomopoulos – Vocals, Guitar
Shant Bismejian – Electric Guitar
theoudplayer (Andrew Kzirian) – Oud, Electric Oud, Saz, Vocals
Alex (Alexan) Khatcherian – Bass, Vocals
Chris Daniel – Drums, Percussion, Vocals
Jivan Gasparyan Jr. – Duduk

Former members
Johnny Nice – Guitar, Keyboards
Carlos Alvarado – Guitar
Danny Shamoun – Percussion
Suguru Onaka – Keyboards, Accordion
Hiram Rosario – Drums
Orbel Babayan – Electric Guitar, Tar, Saz, Vocals

References

American experimental rock groups
American world music groups
Armenian rock music groups
Gypsy punk groups
Hard rock musical groups from California
Heavy metal musical groups from California
Musical groups from Los Angeles
Musical groups established in 2000
Progressive rock musical groups from California